Lee Ashcroft (born 29 August 1993) is a Scottish footballer who plays as a defender for Dundee. Ashcroft previously played for Kilmarnock and Dunfermline Athletic.

Career

Kilmarnock 
Ashcroft made his debut for Kilmarnock on 11 May 2013, as a substitute in a 3–2 victory against Dundee in the Scottish Premier League and then four days later scored his first career goal in a 3–1 loss against Hibernian. On 14 May 2013, Ashcroft signed a new contract with Kilmarnock, keeping him at the club until 2016. Ashcroft captained Kilmarnock for the first time on 4 April 2015, aged 21, in a 2–1 defeat to Motherwell at Rugby Park. On 23 May 2016, he was one of six players released at the end of their contract.

Dunfermline Athletic 
Shortly afterwards Ashcroft signed for recently promoted Scottish Championship side Dunfermline Athletic, making his first start for the club in a 3–0 victory over Arbroath in the Scottish League Cup. His first goal for the club was versus Fife rivals Cowdenbeath in the same competition, where he scored from a Kallum Higginbotham free-kick. Ashcroft's first league match for the Pars was versus Dumbarton, and saw him concede a late penalty and receive a straight red for his last-man challenge on former Dunfermline striker Robert Thomson, though Dunfermline ended the match as 4–3 winners.

Ashcroft was four seasons with the Pars and captained the club for the 2018–19 season. He was released by the club in May 2020 following the expiry of his contract, having appeared in over 160 matches.

Dundee 
In July 2020, Ashcroft signed a two-year deal with Dundee. A regular starter throughout the season, Ashcroft scored his first competitive goal for the Dee in a Scottish Cup win against Bonnyrigg Rose Athletic. Ashcroft would score his first and second league goals for them in an away win against Alloa Athletic. At the end of the league season, Ashcroft was awarded the Andrew De Vries Player of the Year award, as well as the Player's Player of the Year award. Ashcroft was also named to PFA Scotland's Championship Team of the Year for 2020–21. Along with his impressive defensive performances, Ashcroft would amass 7 goals in all competitions, including one in the 2nd leg of the Premiership play-offs final, and was a major factor in helping Dundee gain promotion to the Scottish Premiership. Ashcroft would also be named to the SPFL's Championship Team of the Season.

During a game against Motherwell in December 2021, Ashcroft would damage a tendon in his hamstring which would require surgery and keep him out for approximately 3–4 months. While out with injury, Ashcroft would sign a contract extension with Dundee, keeping him at the club until the summer of 2023. Ashcroft made his return from injury off the bench in a league game against Hibernian in March 2022. After just two starts however, Ashcroft would experience a recurrence of the hamstring injury against Rangers that would end his season and required surgery again.

Ashcroft would make his return for Dundee off the bench in an away league win over Raith Rovers in August. He would score in his first start of the season in a Scottish League Cup win over Falkirk.

Career statistics

Honours

Individual 

 Dundee F.C. Player of the Year: 2020–21
 PFA Scotland Championship Team of the Year: 2020–21
SPFL Championship Team of the Season: 2020–21

References

External links

1993 births
Living people
Scottish footballers
Association football defenders
Scottish Premier League players
Scottish Professional Football League players
Kilmarnock F.C. players
Dunfermline Athletic F.C. players
Dundee F.C. players